John McCurry (born June 24, 1957) is an American musician and composer, a guitarist, songwriter and singer based in New York City. He has worked with many well-known musical artists, including Chicago, Cyndi Lauper, Billy Joel, David Bowie, Alice Cooper, John Waite, Belinda Carlisle, Julian Lennon, Joss Stone, Katy Perry, The Jonas Brothers, and Elliott Yamin.

In 1983, McCurry played lead guitar in the band Cool It Reba. He was lead guitarist in Cyndi Lauper's touring band in the early 1980s. He has also performed in other bands on concert tours, including Anita Baker's Rhythm of Love World Tour in 1994–1995, and John Waite's 1985 American tour. As a performer, McCurry was visually distinctive because of his naturally bright red hair.

On the website allmusic.com, John McCurry is credited as composer on 119 music albums. His genres are described as pop/rock and classical, and his styles as vocal music and opera. He is credited with guitar on 67 albums, out of which ten specify electric guitar, nine specify acoustic guitar, and four specify bass guitar. He is credited with vocals on seven albums, lyricist on one, arranger on one, producer on one, and text on one. He also has one credit each for coral sitar, banjo and accordion. McCurry is listed as either main personnel, performer, primary artist, or guest artist on 10 albums.

McCurry has also written songs for film and television. He has songwriting credits for soundtrack songs: 11 on film soundtracks, 2 on a TV film soundtrack and one in a television series soundtrack. He has a performer credit for one soundtrack song, and has "music department" credits as vocalist on one film, and for electric guitar on one TV series.

Songwriter

Cowritten songs
Songs that were co-written by McCurry with other artists appear on the following albums:
 Mr. Jordan, Julian Lennon, five songs co-written with McCurry
 Trash, Alice Cooper, two songs 
 Mask of Smiles, John Waite, one song 
 Classicks, Alice Cooper, one song
 Help Yourself, Julian Lennon, one song
BBC Sessions and Other Polished Turds, The Vandals, one song (the Alice Cooper song)
 Mask of Smiles, John Waite, one song
 Stone of Sisyphus, Robert Lamm Sleeping in the Middle of the Bed

With Julian Lennon
In an interview on the website "Hey Jules", about Julian Lennon's 1991 album "Help Yourself", Lennon commented about McCurry's musicianship and the songwriting process:

"John McCurry, as usual, did some great stuff with me on this I felt. We didn't actually have that much time together to write this time 'cause he was working on other projects. But we did manage to come up with "Help Yourself."

Lennon also said, about writing the album's title track, "Help Yourself":

"John McCurry and I sat around thinking, 'Well, where are we going to go with this?' and I'd already had part of the music there and then John came in and said, 'Alright, try this' and it was a back and forth thing and we didn't have any lyrics and John again had to, like everybody else I write with, had to disappear back to New York. And I sat around writing and he'd sort of mentioned a couple of ideas and it came together in about two days."

Guitarist
In a review of John Waite's album Rovers Return, about the track "Wild One", Brian McGowan commented that the spirit of the song was "defined in stark relief by John McCurry’s freewheeling, razor sharp axework".

Various others albums that McCurry has played guitar on are:
 Cher (1987 album), Cher
 Heart of Stone, Cher
 Paintings in My Mind, Tommy Page
 The Bridge, Billy Joel
 Hide Your Heart, Bonnie Tyler
 Valotte, Julian Lennon
 The Secret Value of Daydreaming, Julian Lennon
 Mr. Jordan, Julian Lennon
 Help Yourself, Julian Lennon
 Soul Provider, Michael Bolton
 Inside, Matthew Sweet
 No Sound But a Heart, Sheena Easton
 Saints and Sinners, Kane Roberts
 Circle in the Sand, Belinda Carlisle
 Heaven on Earth, Belinda Carlisle
 Some People's Lives, Bette Midler
 Something Real, Phoebe Snow
 Maria Vidal, Maria Vidal
 Rhythm of Love, Anita Baker
 Over My Heart, Laura Branigan
 True Colors, Cyndi Lauper
 A Night to Remember, Cyndi Lauper
 Spoiled Girl, Carly Simon
 Have You Seen Me Lately, Carly Simon
 Discipline, Desmond Child
 Save the Last Dance for Me, Ben E. King
 Satisfied'', Taylor Dayne

References

External links
 More info at UFO, Underground For Overground
 And at Sweet Lorrainne
 One Sweet Lorraine track at 
 Kill Lizzie at 

American male composers
20th-century American composers
Living people
Lead guitarists
American rock guitarists
American male guitarists
American pop guitarists
American session musicians
American male songwriters
1952 births
Songwriters from New York (state)
Guitarists from New York City
20th-century American guitarists
20th-century American male musicians